Ştefan Bănică may refer to:

Ştefan Bănică, Sr. (1933–1995), Romanian singer and actor
Ştefan Bănică, Jr. (born 1967), his son, also a singer and actor